Carl Marcus Christer Antonsson (born 8 May 1991) is a Swedish footballer who plays as a striker for Saudi Arabian club Al-Adalah. He can also play as a forward or as a left winger.

He formerly played for English sides Leeds United and Blackburn Rovers.

Career

Halmstad
Antonsson started his youth career at Unnaryds GoIF before joining Halmstads BK in 2009, making his Allsvenskan debut for Halmstad on 7 November 2010 against Djurgårdens IF. He played 71 league games for Halmstads BK and scored 11 goals.

Kalmar
Antonsson joined Kalmar FF in 2015. He scored 12 goals in 28 appearances in his first season at the club; his 12 goals saw him finish as the third top goalscorer in Allsvenskan. In February 2016, Antonsson extended his contract at Kalmar until 2018.

Antonsson scored 10 goals in his first 12 league games of the 2016–17 Swedish Allsvenskan season for Kalmar FF, making him the top scorer in the Allsvenskan at the time.

Leeds United
On 28 June 2016, Antonsson signed a three-year contract with English side Leeds United for an undisclosed fee. On 5 August, he was given the squad number 10 shirt for the 2016–17 season. On 7 August 2016, he made his competitive debut for the club as a second-half substitute in place of Matt Grimes, during a 3–0 defeat to Queens Park Rangers.

Antonsson scored his first goal for Leeds on 10 August in a League Cup fixture against Fleetwood Town. His second goal of the season, and his first in the league, came on 20 August in a 2–0 win against Sheffield Wednesday. On 26 October, he scored his third of the season for Leeds in their win against Norwich City in the English League Cup; a dramatic penalty shootout victory after a 2–2 draw in extra time.

Blackburn Rovers loan
On 11 August 2017, Blackburn Rovers announced the signing of Antonsson on loan for the season. On 9 September, he scored his first goal for Blackburn Rovers against Rochdale in a 0–3 victory. He went on to score another two goals in September. He found his position changed, being played as a left-sided forward/winger and in November he scored five goals in as many games, going on to win the PFA Player of the Month award for League One.

On 2 January 2018, it was revealed by manager Tony Mowbray that Antonsson had picked up an injury against Scunthorpe on 30 December, and would be ruled out for several weeks. He returned from injury on the 19 February against Bury. On 24 April, he gained automatic promotion to the Championship with Blackburn after their 1–0 win against Doncaster Rovers.

Leeds return
After returning to Leeds, Antonsson was told he was not in the plans of new manager Marcelo Bielsa and held negotiations of a transfer to Italian Serie B Side Brescia, now owned by previous Leeds owner Massimo Cellino.

Malmö FF
On 14 July 2018, Antonsson joined Allsvenskan side Malmö FF on a three year contract for an undisclosed fee from Leeds United after being signed by manager Uwe Rösler. He made his debut for the Swedish club on 21 July 2018, when he came on as a substitute in Malmö's 2–1 away league win over Örebro SK. He crowned a successful autumn with the winning goal at Beşiktaş away from home, as Malmö progressed to the knockout stages of the UEFA Europa League.

Värnamo
On 3 February 2022, Antonsson signed with Allsvenskan newcomer IFK Värnamo.

Al-Adalah
On 25 January 2023, Antonsson joined Saudi Arabian club Al-Adalah.

International career
Uncapped by Sweden, Antonsson was linked with a possible call up to the national side for Euro 2016 due to his form with Kalmar FF; however he was not called upon and missed out on the squad.

Honours
Blackburn Rovers
EFL League One runner-up: 2017–18

Malmö FF
Allsvenskan: 2020

Individual
EFL League One Player of the Month: November 2017

Career statistics

References

External links

1991 births
Living people
Association football forwards
Halmstads BK players
Kalmar FF players
Leeds United F.C. players
Blackburn Rovers F.C. players
Malmö FF players
Stabæk Fotball players
IFK Värnamo players
Al-Adalah FC players
Allsvenskan players
Superettan players
English Football League players
Eliteserien players
Saudi Professional League players
Expatriate footballers in England
Expatriate footballers in Norway
Expatriate footballers in Saudi Arabia
Swedish expatriate footballers
Swedish footballers
Swedish expatriate sportspeople in England
Swedish expatriate sportspeople in Norway
Swedish expatriate sportspeople in Saudi Arabia